Hildur is one of several female given names derived from the name Hild formed from Old Norse hildr, meaning "battle". Hild, a Nordic-German Bellona, was a Valkyrie who conveyed fallen warriors to Valhalla. Warfare was often called Hild's Game. Hildur is rather exclusively used in Nordic counties, but the more recent variations with the same origin, Hilda and Hilde, are in wider use. The Swedish name day for Hildur and Hilda is 18 January.

People named Hildur
Hildur Alice Nilson, birth name of Swedish singer Alice Babs
Hildur Vala Einarsdóttir, Icelandic singer
Hildur Guðnadóttir, Icelandic cellist
Hildur Horn Øien, Norwegian politician
Hildur Krog, Norwegian botanist
Hildur Nygren, Swedish politician
Hildur Os, Norwegian civil servant and politician
Hildur Ottelin, Swedish local politician and gymnastics director
Hildur Þorgeirsdóttir, Icelandic handball player

References

Feminine given names
Icelandic feminine given names
Swedish feminine given names